This is a list of notable events relating to the environment in 2008. They relate to environmental law, conservation, environmentalism and environmental issues.

Events

February
 The Sarawak Corridor of Renewable Energy is launched.

March
 The Ecology Summit was held on Necker Island.

May
The Food, Conservation, and Energy Act is passed in the United States. It has provisions for conservation and energy efficiency.

June
The 60th International Whaling Commission meeting was held in Santiago, Chile.

July
The Agreement on the Conservation of Gorillas and Their Habitats came into effect.

August
Concerns were raised about air pollution at the 2008 Summer Olympics held in Beijing, China.

September
The Waste Minimisation Act 2008 passed into law in New Zealand.

November
The Climate Change Act 2008 passed into law in the United Kingdom.

December
The 2008 United Nations Climate Change Conference took place in Poznań, Poland, between December 1 and December 12, 2008.
The Kingston Fossil Plant coal fly ash slurry spill occurred when an ash dike ruptured at an  solid waste containment area at the Tennessee Valley Authority's Kingston Fossil Plant in Roane County, Tennessee in the United States. An estimated  of coal fly ash slurry was released.

See also

2008 California earthquake study
Human impact on the environment
List of environmental issues